A by-election was held for the Dewan Rakyat parliamentary seat of Teluk Intan on 31 May 2014 following the nomination day on 19 May 2014. The seat was vacated after the death of the incumbent MP, Seah Leong Peng from bladder cancer in Kuala Lumpur on 1 May 2014. Seah was a lawmaker from the Democratic Action Party (DAP), a component party of Pakatan Rakyat (PR) coalition. In the 2013 general election, he defeated Barisan Nasional(BN) candidate and Gerakan president Mah Siew Keong and an independent candidate by 7,313 votes.

The PR candidate in the by-election was DAP's Dyana Sofya Mohd Daud, notable for her status as a rare  Malay politician in the DAP. On 17 May 2014, BN announced that it would again field Mah Siew Keong. 60,349 voters were eligible to vote in the by-election.

Results 
Mah Siew Keong won the election by a slim majority of 238 votes.

References 

2014 elections in Malaysia
2014 Teluk Intan by-election
Elections in Perak